Çavlı is a neighborhood of Dicle district in Diyarbakır Province, Turkey.

Geography 
It is 76 km from Diyarbakır and 16 km from Dicle.

Population

References 

Villages in Dicle District